Jeanne M. Holm was a Knowledge Architect at Jet Propulsion Laboratory and she was involved in the NASA Knowledge Management team.  She has since moved on to other opportunities.

Holm was project manager for the NASA Portal, an internet project which was designed to provide one authoritative source of NASA content to the general public. In June 2003, Holm received an International Competia Award for Competitive Intelligence.

References

NASA people
Living people
Year of birth missing (living people)